Rhoeadine (rheadine) is an alkaloid derived from the flowers of the corn poppy (Papaver rhoeas).  It has been studied for its potential use in the treatment of morphine dependence.

Toxicity 
5 different patients were admitted to ER after being intoxicated with corn poppy. Symptoms of intoxication include nausea, vomiting, confusion, seizures, myosis and arrhythmia.

References 

Alkaloids
Azepanes
Benzodioxoles
Heterocyclic compounds with 6 rings